McLeod Health is a hospital network serving the twelve counties of northeastern South Carolina. McLeod Health was founded in 1906. It is a locally owned, not-for-profit institution. In addition to seven acute care facilities, McLeod Health operates a home health agency, a cancer center, two urgent care facilities, a hospice service, and approximately 85 medical practices.

In July 2010, McLeod Regional Medical Center was honored with the American Hospital Association-McKesson Quest for Quality Prize, awarded annually to a hospital in the United States.

Facilities 
McLeod operates facilities in the Pee Dee area, including four hospitals and a fitness center.

Hospitals 
McLeod Regional Medical Center is a non-profit medical center located on a  campus in downtown Florence which includes 461 licensed beds and 40 Neonatal Intensive Care beds. The hospital complex contains the Cardiovascular Institute, the Center for Advance Surgery, the Cancer Center and a Children's Hospital unit.
 McLeod Darlington is a 49-bed acute hospital located in Darlington, South Carolina. It has 23 inpatient psychiatric beds.
 McLeod Loris: Founded in 1950 in Loris, South Carolina, it is a fully accredited acute care facility with 105 licensed beds.
 McLeod Clarendon is an 81-bed acute hospital located in Manning, South Carolina.
 McLeod Dillon is a 79-bed acute hospital located in Dillon, South Carolina.
 McLeod Seacoast, located in Little River, South Carolina, is a 118-bed hospital offering a wide range of inpatient and outpatient services. Its medical staff includes more than 120 active and affiliate physicians.
 McLeod Cheraw, located in Cheraw, South Carolina, is a  hospital offering a wide range of inpatient and outpatient services. It has a medical staff  of affiliate physicians.

Other facilities 
 McLeod Center for Cancer Treatment & Research
 McLeod Health and Fitness Center is a fitness center located in Florence.
 McLeod Occupational Health
 McLeod Choice Pharmacy: in addition to prescription medications, the pharmacy offers over-the-counter medications and personal care items.
 McLeod Behavioral Health Center is a 23-bed inpatient facility in Darlington providing care to individuals experiencing a primary psychiatric illness with or without a co-occurring substance abuse disorder.

References

External links 
 McLeod Health Homepage

Healthcare in South Carolina
Hospital networks in the United States
Medical and health organizations based in South Carolina